The Hugh Dillon Redemption Choir is a Canadian indie rock band led by Hugh Dillon and based in Kingston, Ontario. The band's style draws from country, pop, punk and new wave influences.

History 
Dillon formed the band in Kingston in 2004. Lead singer Dillon projected a less aggressive style in this band than in his previous group Headstones. That year the band released an album, The High Co$t of Low Living, through Paul Langois' Ching Music label. Two tracks from this album were included as extras in the DVD version of the dramatic series Durham County: Season 1.

The Redemption Choir performed in the Tragically Hip's Across the Causeway show. The band's members also performed behind Dillon on his solo album Works Well with Others in 2009, released through Paul Langois' Bathouse Studio.

Band members 
Hugh Dillon – vocals (2004–present)
J.P. Polsoni – guitar (2004–present)
Ben Kobayashi – keyboards (2004–present)
Chris Osti – bass (2004–present)
Derek Downham – drums (2004–present)

Discography 
The High Co$t of Low Living (2005)

See also 

Music of Canada
Canadian rock
List of Canadian musicians
:Category:Canadian musical groups

References

External links 
Hugh Dillon Redemption Choir official website
Chart Attack review, May 2, 2005

Musical groups established in 2004
Canadian indie rock groups
Musical groups from Kingston, Ontario
2004 establishments in Ontario